Volkswagen 3 may refer to:
Volkswagen Type 3 (1961–1973)
Volkswagen ID.3 (2019–)